The men's pommel horse event was part of the gymnastics programme at the 1932 Summer Olympics. It was contested for the fifth time after 1896, 1904, 1924, and 1928. The competition was held on Thursday, August 11, 1932. Ten gymnasts from five nations competed. Each nation was limited to three gymnasts. The event was won by István Pelle of Hungary, the nation's first medal in the pommel horse. Italy also earned its first medal in the event, with Omero Bonoli's silver. Frank Haubold took bronze, the United States' first medal in the event since 1904.

Background

This was the fifth appearance of the event, which is one of the five apparatus events held every time there were apparatus events at the Summer Olympics (no apparatus events were held in 1900, 1908, 1912, or 1920). Five of the gymnasts from 1928 returned: bronze medalist Heikki Savolainen and seventh-place finisher Mauri Nyberg-Noroma of Finland, along with István Pelle of Hungary and Al Jochim and Frank Haubold of the United States. The reigning (1930) world champion was Josip Primozic of Yugoslavia, but Yugoslavia did not have any gymnasts travel to Los Angeles.

Mexico made its debut in the men's pommel horse. The United States made its fourth appearance, most of any nation, having missed only the inaugural 1896 Games.

Competition format

For the second (after 1896) and last time, the pommel horse competition was entirely separate from the individual all-around rather than being entirely aggregated into the all-around or sharing qualification results. Each gymnast performed one compulsory exercise and one voluntary exercise. The score for each exercise was up to 30 points, with a combined score of 60 points maximum.

Schedule

Results

A separate competition was held, unrelated to the all-around event. Two exercises were contested with the results based on total points.

References

External links
 Olympic Report
 

Pommel horse
Men's 1932